La Chapelle-Saint-Ouen is a commune in the Seine-Maritime department in the Normandy region in northern France.

Geography

Population

Places of interest
 An old manorhouse.
 The sixteenth-century château de Bruquedalle.
 The church of St.Ouen, dating from the eighteenth century.
 The church of St.Jean-Baptiste, dating from the eighteenth century.

See also
Communes of the Seine-Maritime department

References

Communes of Seine-Maritime